The Desert Sessions are a musical collective series, founded by Josh Homme in 1997. Artists such as Brant Bjork, PJ Harvey, Twiggy Ramirez, Dave Catching, Nick Oliveri, Mark Lanegan, John McBain, Ben Shepherd, Josh Freese, Chris Goss, Alain Johannes, Troy Van Leeuwen, Dean Ween, Les Claypool and many others from the Palm Desert Scene have contributed as songwriters and musicians.

History
The Desert Sessions began in August 1997 at the Rancho De La Luna in Joshua Tree when Josh Homme brought together musicians from the bands Monster Magnet, Goatsnake, earthlings?, Kyuss (his own band, which had split in 1995.) The ranch is an old house filled with rare and unique recording equipment and instruments and was owned by Dave Catching and the late Fred Drake. Songs are written "on the spot", often in a matter of hours. Many stories have grown around the Sessions. For example, the song "Creosote" from Volumes 9 & 10 was written by Dean Ween and Alain Johannes on the ranch's front porch within four minutes of meeting each other. Similarly, Chris Goss and PJ Harvey wrote the song "There Will Never Be A Better Time" for I See You Hearin' Me after going out onto the porch of the ranch for four minutes with an acoustic guitar; they re-entered the house and recorded the song in one take, the only time the song was ever played by the collective.

The first Desert Session was not actually a "session" per se, but Homme and his band at the time (The Acquitted Felons) playing for three days straight on psychedelic mushrooms. Since then, the Desert Sessions have become legendary, growing in intensity and artistic merit. Homme said:

The Desert Sessions have only performed live twice. The live incarnation, which included Joey Castillo, Troy Van Leeuwen, Brian O'Connor, and Homme, as well as a variety of musicians performing different songs, have performed on an episode of the British music television show Later... with Jools Holland as well as the Coachella Valley Music and Arts Festival in 2004.

After 11 years of inactivity, Homme revealed in October 2014 that he would start working on more Desert Sessions material the following year. However, things remained silent until May 2019, when Homme posted an image on Instagram with the hashtags "#Desert, #Sessions, #11, #12". In August 2019, Matt Berry confirmed in an interview that he is involved with new Desert Sessions. In September 2019, Desert Sessions Volumes 11 & 12 were officially announced, along with a comedic promo video featuring Homme and Liam Lynch. The promo includes Homme running through some of the featured artists such as Billy Gibbons, Les Claypool, and Jake Shears.

Recording history

In a 2007 interview with Rockline, Homme stated that he was going to be working on a new Desert Sessions album in December 2007 and the first ten will be re-released as a box set, however more years passed since any activity happened. 

In 2019, the first time new Desert Sessions were released in sixteen years, Homme commented on the delay: "Because Desert Sessions works best at a certain time of the year, when everything slows and everyone takes a deep breath out. At the end of the year, in that December-January timeframe, everyone has exhaled. And post-exhale is the time to do something like that. So if I miss that window… I miss that window."
.

Discography

Original EPs
Volume 1: Instrumental Driving Music for Felons (1997)
Volume 2: Status: Ships Commander Butchered (1998)
Volume 3: Set Coordinates for the White Dwarf!!! (1998)
Volume 4: Hard Walls and Little Trips (1998)
Volume 5: Poetry for the Masses (SeaShedShitheadByTheSheSore) (1999)
Volume 6: Black Anvil Ego (1999)
Volume 7: Gypsy Marches (2001) 
Volume 8: Can You See Under My Thumb? There You Are.(2001)
Volume 9: I See You Hearin' Me (2003)
Volume 10: I Heart Disco (2003)
Volume 11: Arrivederci Despair (2019)
Volume 12: Tightwads & Nitwits & Critics & Heels (2019)

Compilation albums
Volumes 1 & 2 (1998)
Volumes 3 & 4 (1998)
Volumes 5 & 6 (1999)
Volumes 7 & 8 (2001)
Volumes 9 & 10 (2003)
Volumes 11 & 12 (2019)

Singles
Crawl Home (2003)

Note
Desert Sessions 7 & 8, 9 & 10, and 11 & 12 were never released independently of each other. The first two were originally released as two double EPs, and the latter as a single LP.

Collaborating artists

Notes

References

External links
 Desert Sessions Official site
 

Grammy Award winners
Musical collectives
Rock music groups from California
Musical groups established in 1997
American stoner rock musical groups
Man's Ruin Records artists
Ipecac Recordings artists
Southern Lord Records artists
Matador Records artists
1997 establishments in California